TechnoMotion is a Korean music video game. As in other games that use dance pads, such as Dance Dance Revolution, a player must press panels in response to scrolling arrows on the game's monitor.

Modes
TechnoMotion has three distinct gameplay modes:
 Cross mode: Uses the left, right, up, and down panels (like Dance Dance Revolution). 
 Diagonal mode: Uses the corner and center panels (like Pump It Up). 
 TechnoMotion mode: Uses all panels except the center.
 Double mode (both sides), only in 4- and 5-panel modes. There is no 16-panel mode; however, an unofficial 16-panel mode was added in StepMania 5.

It is possible to change the panel mode between and during songs in the game with switches on the cabinet. A player has the option to play in Single mode (one player, one pad) or Versus mode (two players, two pads). There are four difficulty levels: Easy, Normal, Hard, and Double(one player, both pads). Each difficulty has a separate songlist, and each pattern is rated with 1 to 12 small diamond icons.

Music
All but one of the TechnoMotion songs are of the K-Pop music genre. TechnoMotion's songlist is mostly composed of new licenses, but there are a few veteran songs which were found in Pump It Up and Dance Dance Revolution's 3rd Mix Korean before appearing in TechnoMotion. The songs listed here that were included in Pump It Up was because after Technomotion F2 Systems paid Andamiro to use the Pump It Up license to create Pump It Up Extra Mix.

TechnoMotion has four different songlists: one for each mode of play.

Easy Mode with
18 songs

Normal Mode with
18 songs

Hard Mode with
16 songs

Double Mode with
21 songs

TechnoMotion Song Lists (including the 2nd Dance Floor version):

A Man Tales (Nam-ja E-ya-gi) - Honey Family

Another Truth (Tto-da-reun Jin-Sim) - Novasonic

Ba Kkwo (Change) - Lee Jung-hyun

Broken Heart (Sil Yeon, The Disappointed Love) - Koyote

Bump - NRG

C.O.C. (Choice of Cinderella) - Keoun So-young

Cyber Lover - Turbo

Dream - Hyun Seung-min

Emotion - Yoo Chae-yeong

First Love (Cho Ryun Techno Mix)- Clon

Flower - Yoo Chae-yeong

Freedom (Ja-yoo) - O-24

Funky Tonight - Clon

Gagaai (Closer) - S#arp

Get Up - Baby V.O.X.

Hatred (Jeung-O) - Novasonic

Heartlessness (Mu-Jeong) - Chae Jung-an

I'm A Trashman (Na-neun Sse-rae-gi-ya) - N.EX.T

Killer - Baby V.O.X.

Loner - T.T.MA

Love Story - See U

Party Party - Koyote

Pierrot - Lee Hyun-do

Recollection (Hwoe-sang) - Turbo

Shadow - NRG

Starian - Duke

Staring At The Sun - The Offspring (international song)

Tell Me Tell Me - S#arp

Wa! (Come On!) - Lee Jung-hyun

Win Win	- The Bros.

Total: 30 Songs

Simulation
TechnoMotion's 4-panel and 5-panel modes can be simulated by StepMania, in its Dance Dance Revolution and Pump It Up modes. An add-on has been released allowing 8-panel play. It was released as a theme with new arrow skins and metrics.

Gameplay
As with most rhythm-based games, TechnoMotion's gameplay consists of scrolling objects (in this case, arrows) that rise from the bottom of the screen to the top. When the graphics reach the top, the player must contact buttons on a metal pad with their feet. To help the player determine when to step on the pad, an area at the top of the screen has a set of target arrows identical to the scrolling arrows.

These arrows are arranged in a unique way. Starting from the left:
 Down left
 Left
 Up left
 Down
 Up
 Up right
 Right
 Down right

The pad and the arrows are also color coordinated. The colors are:
 Both diagonals down - Blue
 Left and right - Green
 Both diagonals up - Red
 Up and Down - Yellow
 Center - Pink or purple

Technomotion is also unique among dance games in that many stepcharts have hidden, or "secret" steps, which do not show up until they are hit.  However, there is a code which can make them appear as normal steps. Another unique feature of Technomotion is that you could challenge other players in the same way you would challenge in a fighting game.

Company
TechnoMotion was created by the Korean Arcade company F2 System. F2 System still exists, though production of TechnoMotion has stopped. F2 now makes gambling style arcade games, PC MMORPG games, and standard arcade games. Many of their Gambling games center around a tropical theme, distinguishing themselves from other companies.

F2 was founded in 1995, and its first offering was a coin-op "Blank n Holdem."

Their MMO offerings are typical KMMO fare. One centers on a fantasy universe, another around creating an avatar in an online world to interact with others, and the final about space exploration.

No mention of TechnoMotion is made on F2's website, aside from an unclickable graphic on the last page of their games list.

Versions

There are only 2 editions of TechnoMotion. The first has no subtitle, while the second is called "TechnoMotion: The 2nd Dance Floor".

See also
 Contemporary culture of South Korea
 Dance pad

External links
 Former site at the Internet Archive

2000 video games
Dance video games
Video games developed in South Korea
Arcade video games
Arcade-only video games
Music video games